Christa is a  female given name, which means "anointed" or "chosen one". Its use is rare and can be mostly found in Sweden, Finland, Norway, Denmark and Germany.

People with the name
Christa Ackroyd (born 1957), British television and radio presenter
Christa B. Allen (born 1991), American child actress
Christa Anbeek (born 1961), Dutch theologist, professor and rector of the Remonstrants seminary
Christa Bäckman (born 1962), Swedish archer
Christa Bauch (born 1947), German professional bodybuilder
Christa Beran (1922–1992), Austrian Righteous Among the Nations
Christa Blanke (born 1948), German Lutheran theologian and animal welfare activist
Christa Bonhoff, German opera singer
Christa Borden (21st century), Canadian pop singer
Christa Bortignon (born 1937), Canadian masters athlete
Christa Brosseau, Canadian chemist
Christa Calamas (21st century), former Secretary of the Florida Agency for HCA
Christa Campbell (born 1973), American actress and model
Christa Castro, Honduran politician
Christa Collins (born 1979), American singer, dancer, model and songwriter
Christa Cowrie (born 1949), German-Mexican photographer
Christa Czekay (1944–2017), West German sprinter
Christa L. Deeleman-Reinhold (born 1930), Dutch arachnologist
Christa Deguchi (born 1995), Canadian judoka
Christa Dichgans (1940–2018), German painter
Christa D'Souza (born 1960), British journalist
Christa Dürscheid (born 1959), German linguist and academic
Christa Ehrmann-Hämmerle (born 1957), Austrian historian 
Christa Eka, Cameroonian film actress
Christa Faust (born 1969), American author
Christa Fontana (20th century), Italian luger
Christa Fouché, New Zealand academic
Christa Gannon (20th century), American basketball player
Christa Gietl (born 1977), Italian luger
Christa Goetsch (born 1952), German politician
Christa Göhler (1935–2010), German cross-country skier
Christa Harmotto (born 1986), American volleyball player
Christa Hughes (21st century), Australian singer
Christa Jaarsma (born 1952), Dutch speed skater
Christa Jansohn (born 1958), German academic
Christa Johnson (born 1958), American golfer
Christa Kinshofer (born 1961), retired German alpine skier
Christa Klaß (born 1951), German politician
Christa Klecker (20th century), Austrian luger
Christa Köhler (born 1951), East German diver
Christa Krammer (born 1944), Austrian politician
Christa Lang (born 1943), German-American actress and screenwriter
Christa Lehmann (born 1922), German serial killer
Christa Linder (born 1943), German actress
Christa Luding-Rothenburger (born 1959), former speed skater and track cyclist
Christa Ludwig (1928–2021), German opera singer
Christa Luft (born 1938), German economist and politician
Christa Markwalder (born 1975), Swiss politician
Christa Mayer, German opera singer
Christa McAuliffe (1948–1986), American teacher and astronaut
Christa Merten (1944–1986), German long-distance runner
Christa Miller (born 1964), American actress
Christa Mulack (born 1943), German educator
Christa Muth (born 1949), German systems scientist, management professor and management consultant
Christa Neuper (born 1958), Austrian psychologist
Christa Nickels (born 1952), German politician
Christa Öckl (born 1943), German archer
Christa Perathoner (born 1987), Italian biathlete
Christa Peters (1933–1981), German fashion photographer
Christa Päffgen (1938–1988), German fashion model, later actress & singer known as Nico
Christa Pike (born 1976), American murderer
Christa Prets (born 1947), Austrian politician
Christa Randzio-Plath (born 1940), German lawyer
Christa Reinig (1926–2008), German poet, writer and dramatist
Christa Riffel (born 1998), German racing cyclist
Christa Rigozzi (born 1983), Miss Switzerland 2006
Christa Ruppert (1935–2010), German-born Portuguese violinist
Christa Sammler (born 1932), German sculptor
Christa Sauls (born 1972), American model and actress
Christa Schmidt (born 1941), German politician
Christa Schroeder (1908–1984), one of Nazi dictator Adolf Hitler’s personal secretaries
Christa Schumann-Lottmann (born 1964), Guatemalan sprinter
Christa Siems (1916–1990), German actress
Christa Simmons (born 1985), Guyanese beauty pageant winner
Christa Kabitz Sommer (1918-2011), German artist
Christa Speck (1942-2013), German model and actress
Christa Staak (21st century), German rower
Christa Striezel (born 1949), German long jumper
Christa Stubnick (1933–2021), East German athlete
Christa Théret (born 1991), French actress
Christa Tordy (1904–1945), German actress
Christa Agnes Tuczay (born 1952), Austrian university professor
Christa Vahlensieck (born 1949), German long-distance runner
Christa Frieda Vogel (born 1960), German photographer
Christa von Szabó, Austrian figure skater
Christa Wells (born 1973), American singer-songwriter
Christa Wiese (born 1967), German shot putter
Christa Williams (1926-2012), German pop singer
Christa Williams (softball) (born 1978), American softball player
Christa Winsloe (1888–1944), German novelist, playwright and sculptor
Christa Wolf (1929–2011), German literary critic, novelist, and essayist
Christa Worthington (1956–2002), American fashion writer
Christa Zechmeister (born 1957), German alpine skier

References

Feminine given names
German feminine given names
Greek feminine given names
Swedish feminine given names